Kishara George (born 22 September 1983) is a retired Grenadian sprinter. On 6 July 2003 at the Central American and Caribbean Championships in Athletics she was part of a 4×400 m relay team that placed second to Jamaica but still managed to set a new National Record time of 3:32.99 minutes in the event. On 28 May 2004, this time competing in the 400 m hurdles she was again able to set a national record with a time of 58.37.

Competition record

References

1983 births
Living people
Grenadian female sprinters
Grenadian female hurdlers